The Good-Humoured Ladies (Le donne de buon umore) is a ballet with scenery and costumes by Léon Bakst, choreography by Léonide Massine, and music arranged from sonatas of Domenico Scarlatti by Vincenzo Tommasini.  Written in 1917, the piece was based on a comedy by Carlo Goldoni; its plot concerns the diversions of a count disguised as a woman, at a carnival. It was produced in Rome in April 1917 by Sergei Diaghilev's Ballets Russes.

The ballet was later arranged into a suite for orchestra, in six movements:
I: Overture (Allegro)
II. Presto
III: Allegro
IV: Andante
V: Tempo di ballo (Non presto)
VI: Cat's Fugue and Finale (Presto).

The Scarlatti sonatas adapted for the ballet are:
 G major, K. 2, L. 388, P. 58
 D major, K. 435, L. 361, P. 466
 B minor, K. 87, L. 33, P. 43
 G major, K. 455, L. 209, P. 354
 G minor, K. 30, L. 499, P. 86 (Cat's Fugue)
 D major, K. 430, L. 463, P. 463
 F major, K. 445, L. 385, P. 468.

References
David Ewen, Encyclopedia of Concert Music.  New York; Hill and Wang, 1959.

Ballets by Léonide Massine
Ballets to the music of Domenico Scarlatti
Compositions by Vincenzo Tommasini
Ballets designed by Léon Bakst
1917 ballet premieres
1917 compositions
Arrangements of classical compositions